Harvey is a 1996 American made-for-television fantasy-comedy film and a remake of the 1950 classic film (starring James Stewart) based on Mary Chase's 1944 play of the same name. The television adaptation was directed by George Schaefer (his final film project) and starred Harry Anderson (as the eccentric Elwood P. Dowd), Leslie Nielsen, and Swoosie Kurtz. Though it was filmed in 1996, the film sat on the shelf until July 18, 1999, when it was broadcast by CBS, two years after Schaefer's death.

Plot
Anderson stars as Elwood P. Dowd, a lovable eccentric who claims to have a six-foot invisible rabbit named Harvey as his best friend. Although that amuses people, Elwood's sister Veta (Kurtz) wants him committed to an asylum. Dr. Chumley (Nielsen), the operator of the facility, and several of his employees end up believing in Elwood and that forces them to make their own decisions about his future.

Cast
Harry Anderson as Elwood P. Dowd
Leslie Nielsen as Dr. Chumley
Swoosie Kurtz as Veta Simmons
Jonathan Banks as C.J. Lofgren, cab driver
Jessica Hecht as Miss Ruth Kelly
William Schallert as Judge Gaffney
Lisa Akey as Myrtle Mae Simmons
Jim O'Heir as Duane Wilson
Robert Wisden as Dr. Sanderson
Lynda Boyd as Mrs. Chumley
Alex Ferguson as Zabladowski
Sheila Moore as Mrs. Chauvenet
Sheelah Megill as Miss Tewksbury
Robin Kelly as Mrs. Greenwalt
Ingrid Tesch as Girl Reporter

Production
The film was shot in Vancouver, British Columbia, Canada.

References

External links

1996 television films
1996 films
1990s fantasy comedy films
American fantasy comedy films
Remakes of American films
CBS network films
Films set in psychiatric hospitals
American films based on plays
Films shot in Vancouver
Films directed by George Schaefer
Sonar Entertainment films
1990s English-language films
1990s American films